Cyprus originally confirmed to participate in the Junior Eurovision Song Contest 2005 which took place in Hasselt, Belgium. Rena Kiriakidi was chosen to represent the country with the song "Tsirko", but were forced to withdraw, as the song was said to be too similar to another song. However, the Cypriot viewers were able to watch the show and vote.

Before Junior Eurovision

National final

At Junior Eurovision

Voting

References 

Cyprus
2005
Junior Eurovision Song Contest